Sevenoaks Hockey Club is a field hockey club that is based at Hollybush Lane in Sevenoaks, Kent. The club was founded in 1911.

The club runs seven men's teams  with the first XI playing in the Men's England Hockey League Division One South and eight women's teams  with the first XI playing in the Women's England Hockey League Division One South.

References

English field hockey clubs
1911 establishments in England
Sport in Kent